Belgian Bowl XVIII was played in 2005 and was won by the Antwerp Diamonds. This was the third consecutive appearance of Antwerp in the Belgian Bowl and the second consecutive win.

Playoffs
The 2 teams that play in the Belgian Bowl are the winners of the Belgian Bowl playoffs.

References

External links
Official Belgian Bowl website

American football in Belgium
Belgian Bowl
Belgian Bowl